KMNA (98.7 FM) is a radio station broadcasting a Regional Mexican format. Licensed to Mabton, Washington, United States, the station serves the Yakima area.  The station is currently owned by Amador and Rosalie Bustos' Bustos Media, through licensee Bustos Media Holdings, LLC.

History
The station went on the air as KLES on 1997-03-05. On 2006-05-25, the station changed its call sign to the current KMNA.

References

External links

MNA
Radio stations established in 1998
1998 establishments in Washington (state)